Delta IV is a group of five expendable launch systems in the Delta rocket family introduced in the early 2000s. Originally designed by Boeing's Defense, Space and Security division for the Evolved Expendable Launch Vehicle (EELV) program, the Delta IV became a United Launch Alliance (ULA) product in 2006. The Delta IV is primarily a launch vehicle for United States Air Force (USAF) military payloads, but has also been used to launch a number of United States government non-military payloads and a single commercial satellite.

The Delta IV originally had two main versions which allowed the family to cover a range of payload sizes and masses: the retired Medium (which had four configurations) and Heavy. As of 2019, only the Heavy remains active, with payloads that would previously fly on Medium moving to either the existing Atlas V or the forthcoming Vulcan. Retirement of the Delta IV is anticipated in 2024. , two flights remain.

Delta IV vehicles are built in the ULA facility in Decatur, Alabama. Final assembly is completed at the launch site by ULA: at the horizontal integration facility for launches from SLC-37B pad at Cape Canaveral and in a similar facility for launches from SLC-6 pad at Vandenberg Air Force Base.

History 
The latest evolutionary development of the Delta rocket family, Delta IV was introduced to meet the requirements of the United States Air Force's (USAF) Evolved Expendable Launch Vehicle (EELV, now National Security Space Launch (NSSL)) program. While the Delta IV retains the name of the Delta family of rockets, major changes were incorporated. Perhaps the most significant change was the switch from kerosene to liquid hydrogen fuel, with new tankage and a new engine required.

During the Delta IV's development, a small variant was considered. This would have featured the Delta II second stage, an optional Thiokol Star 48B third stage, and the Delta II payload fairing, all atop a single Common Booster Core (CBC). The Small variant was dropped by 1999.

In 2002, the Delta IV was first launched, with the RS-68 becoming the first large liquid-propellant rocket engine designed in the United States since the Space Shuttle main engine (SSME) in the 1970s.

The L3 Technologies Redundant Inertial Flight Control Assembly (RIFCA) guidance system originally used on the Delta IV was common to that carried on the Delta II, although the software was different because of the differences between the Delta II and Delta IV. The RIFCA featured six ring laser gyroscopes and accelerometers each, to provide a higher degree of reliability.

Boeing initially intended to market Delta IV commercial launch services. However, the Delta IV entered the space launch market when global capacity was already much higher than demand. Furthermore, as an unproven design it had difficulty finding a market in commercial launches, and Delta IV launch costs are higher than comparable vehicles of the same era. In 2003, Boeing pulled the Delta IV from the commercial market, citing low demand and high costs. In 2005, Boeing stated that it sought to return the Delta IV to commercial service.

As of 2009, the USAF funded Delta IV EELV engineering, integration, and infrastructure work through contracts with Boeing Launch Services (BLS). On 8 August 2008, the USAF Space and Missile Systems Center increased the "cost plus award fee" contract with BLS for US$1.656 billion to extend the period of performance through the 30 September 2008 (FY09). In addition a US$557.1 million option was added to cover FY10.

In February 2010, naturalized citizen Dongfan Chung, an engineer working with Boeing, was the first person convicted under the Economic Espionage Act of 1996. Chung passed on classified information on designs including the Delta IV rocket to China and was sentenced to 15 years.

In March 2015, ULA announced plans to phase out the Delta IV Medium by 2018.

With the exception of the first launch, which carried the Eutelsat W5 commercial communications satellite, all Delta IV launches have been paid for by the US government. In 2015, ULA stated that a Delta IV Heavy is sold for nearly US$400 million.

RS-68A booster engine upgrade 
The possibility of a higher performance Delta IV was first proposed in a 2006 RAND Corporation study of national security launch requirements out to 2020. A single National Reconnaissance Office (NRO) payload required an increase in the lift capability of the Delta IV Heavy. Lift capacity was increased by developing the higher-performance RS-68A engine, which first flew on 29 June 2012. ULA phased out the baseline RS-68 engine with the launch of Delta flight 371 on 25 March 2015. All following launches have used the RS-68A, and the engine's higher thrust allowed the use of a single standardized CBC design for all Delta IV Medium and M+ versions. This upgrade reduced cost and increased flexibility, since any standardized CBC could be configured for zero, two, or four solid-propellant rocket boosters. However, the new CBC led to a slight performance loss for most medium configurations. The Delta IV Heavy still requires non-standard CBCs for the core and boosters.

Launch system status

Payload capacities after RS-68A upgrade

Payload capacities with original RS-68

*Masses include a Payload Attach Fitting (240 kg to 1,221 kg depending on payload).

Proposed upgrades that were not implemented 
Possible future upgrades for the Delta IV included adding extra strap-on solid motors, higher-thrust main engines, lighter materials, higher-thrust second stages, more (up to eight) strap-on CBCs, and a cryogenic propellant cross feed from strap on boosters to the common core.

At one point NASA planned to use Delta IV or Atlas V to launch the proposed Orbital Space Plane, which eventually became the Crew Exploration Vehicle and then the Orion. Orion was intended to fly on the Ares I launch vehicle, then the Space Launch System after Ares I was cancelled.

In 2009, The Aerospace Corporation reported on NASA results of a study to determine the feasibility of modifying Delta IV to be crew-rated for use in NASA human spaceflight missions. According to Aviation Week & Space Technology the study, "found that a Delta IV heavy [...] could meet NASA's requirements for getting humans to low Earth orbit".

A proposed upgrade to the Delta IV family was the addition of extra solid motors. The Medium+ (4,4) would have used existing mount points to pair the four GEM 60s of the M+ (5,4) with the upper stage and fairing of the (4,2). It was also considered to add extra GEM 60s to the M+ (5,4), which would have required adding extra attachment points, structural changes to cope with the different flight loads, and launch pad and infrastructure changes. The Medium+ (5,6) and (5,8) could have been available within 48 months of the first order.

Successors 
The Vulcan Centaur is planned to replace the Atlas V and Delta IV rockets. Vulcan Centaur is projected to enter service by 2023, using the BE-4 methane-fueled rocket engine. The Delta IV Heavy and Atlas V are expected to stay in service for a few years after Vulcan's inaugural launch, and the Heavy is expected to be discontinued by 2024.

Vehicle description

Delta IV Medium 
The Delta IV Medium (also referred to as 'single stick') was available in four configurations: Medium, Medium+ (4,2), Medium+ (5,2), and Medium+ (5,4).

The Delta IV Medium (Delta 9040) was the most basic Delta IV. It featured a single CBC and a modified Delta III second stage, with 4-meter liquid hydrogen and liquid oxygen tanks (called a Delta Cryogenic Second Stage (DCSS)) and a 4-meter payload fairing. The Delta IV Medium was capable of launching 4,200 kg to geostationary transfer orbit (GTO). From Cape Canaveral, GTO is 1804 m/s away from GEO. The mass of fairing and payload attach fittings have been subtracted from the gross performance.

The Delta IV Medium+ (4,2) (Delta 9240) had the same CBC and DCSS as the Medium, but with the addition of two Orbital ATK-built 1.5-m (60-in) diameter solid rocket booster Graphite-Epoxy Motors (GEM 60s) strap-on boosters to increase payload capacity to 6,150 kg to GTO.

The Delta IV Medium+ (5,2) (Delta 9250) was similar to the Medium+ (4,2), but had a 5-m–diameter DCSS and payload fairing for larger payloads. Because of the extra weight of the larger payload fairing and second stage, the Medium+ (5,2) could launch 5,072 kg to GTO.

The Delta IV Medium+ (5,4) (Delta 9450) was similar to the Medium+ (5,2), but used four GEM 60s instead of two, enabling it to lift 6,882 kg to GTO.

To encapsulate the satellite payload, a variety of different payload fairings were available. A stretched Delta III 4-meter diameter composite payload fairing was used on 4-meter Medium versions, while an enlarged, 5-meter diameter composite fairing was used on 5-meter Medium versions.

The Medium (4,2) version last flew on 22 August 2019, marking the retirement of the Delta IV Medium variants.

Delta IV Heavy 

The Delta IV Heavy (Delta 9250H) combines a  diameter DCSS and payload fairing with two additional CBCs. These are strap-on boosters which are separated earlier in the flight than the center CBC. As of 2007, a longer 5 meter diameter composite fairing was standard on the Delta IV Heavy, with an aluminum isogrid fairing also available. The aluminum trisector (three-part) fairing was built by Boeing and derived from a Titan IV fairing. The trisector fairing was first used on the DSP-23 flight.

Common Booster Core 

Each Delta IV consists of at least one Common Booster Core (CBC). Each CBC is powered by one Aerojet Rocketdyne RS-68 engine, which burns liquid hydrogen and liquid oxygen.

On flights of the Medium, the RS-68 ran at 102% rated thrust for the first few minutes of flight, and then throttled down to 58% rated thrust before main engine cutoff. On the Heavy, the main CBC's engine throttles down to 58% rated thrust around 50 seconds after liftoff, while the strap-on CBCs remain at 102%. This conserves propellant and allows the main CBC to burn after booster separation. After the strap-on CBCs separate, the main CBC's engine again throttles up to 102% before throttling back down to 58% prior to main engine cutoff.

The RS-68 engine is mounted to the lower thrust structure of the CBC by a four-legged (quadrapod) thrust frame and enclosed in a protective composite conical thermal shield. Above the thrust structure is an aluminum isogrid (a grid pattern machined out of the inside of the tank to reduce weight) liquid hydrogen tank, followed by a composite cylinder called the centerbody, an aluminum isogrid liquid oxygen tank, and a forward skirt. Along the back of the CBC is a cable tunnel to hold electrical and signal lines, and a feedline to carry the liquid oxygen to the RS-68 from the tank. The CBC is of a constant,  diameter.

Delta Cryogenic Second Stage 

The upper stage of the Delta IV is the Delta Cryogenic Second Stage (DCSS). The DCSS is based on the Delta III upper stage but has increased propellant capacity. Two versions have been produced: a  diameter DCSS that was retired with the Delta IV Medium and a  diameter DCSS that remains in service with the Delta IV Heavy. The 4 m diameter version lengthened both Delta III propellant tanks, while the 5-meter version has an extended diameter liquid hydrogen tank and a further lengthened liquid oxygen tank. Regardless of the diameter, each DCSS is powered by one RL10B-2 engine, with an extendable carbon-carbon nozzle to improve specific impulse. Two different interstages are used to mate the first stage and DCSS. A tapering interstage that narrowed down from 5 m to 4 m diameter was used to mate the 4 m DCSS to the CBC, while a cylindrical interstage is used to mate the 5 m DCSS. Both interstages were built from composites and enclosed the liquid oxygen tank, with the larger liquid hydrogen tank making up part of the vehicle's outer mold line.

Launch sites 

Delta IV launches occur from either of two rocket launch complexes. Launches on the East coast of the United States use Space Launch Complex 37 (SLC-37) at the Cape Canaveral Air Force Station. On the West coast, polar-orbit and high-inclination launches use Vandenberg Air Force Base's Space Launch Complex 6 (SLC-6).

Launch facilities at both sites are similar.  A Horizontal Integration Facility (HIF) is situated some distance from the pad. Delta IV CBCs and second stages to be mated and tested in the HIF before they are moved to the pad. The partial horizontal rocket assembly of the Delta IV is somewhat similar to the Soyuz launch vehicle, which is completely assembled horizontally. The Space shuttles, the past Saturn launch vehicles, and the upcoming Space Launch System are assembled and rolled out to the launch pad entirely vertically.

Movement of the Delta IVs among the various facilities at the pad is facilitated by rubber-tired Elevating Platform Transporters (EPTs) and various transport jigs. Diesel engine EPTs are used for moving the vehicles from the HIF to the pad, while electric EPTs are used in the HIF, where precision of movement is important.

The basic launchpad structure includes a flame trench to direct the engine plume away from the rocket, lightning protection, and propellant storage. In the case of Delta IV, the vehicle is completed on the launch pad inside a building. This Mobile Service Tower (MST) provides service access to the rocket and protection from the weather and is rolled away from the rocket on launch day. A crane at the top of the MST lifts the encapsulated payload to the vehicle and also attached the GEM 60 solid motors for Delta IV Medium launches. The MST is rolled away from the rocket several hours before launch. At Vandenberg, the launch pad also has a Mobile Assembly Shelter (MAS), which completely encloses the vehicle; at CCAFS, the vehicle is partly exposed near its bottom.

Beside the vehicle is a Fixed Umbilical Tower (FUT), which has two (VAFB) or three (CCAFS) swing arms. These arms carry telemetry signals, electrical power, hydraulic fluid, environmental control air flow, and other support functions to the vehicle through umbilical lines. The swing arms retract at T-0 seconds once the vehicle is committed to launch.

Under the vehicle is a Launch Table, with six Tail Service Masts (TSMs), two for each CBC. The Launch Table supports the vehicle on the pad, and the TSMs provide further support and fueling functions for the CBCs. The vehicle is mounted to the Launch Table by a Launch Mate Unit (LMU), which is attached to the vehicle by bolts that sever at launch. Behind the Launch Table is a Fixed Pad Erector (FPE), which uses two long-stroke hydraulic pistons to raise the vehicle to the vertical position after being rolled to the pad from the HIF. Beneath the Launch Table is a flame duct, which deflects the rocket's exhaust away from the rocket or facilities.

Vehicle processing 
Delta IV CBCs and DCSSs are assembled at ULA's factory in Decatur, Alabama. They are then loaded onto the R/S RocketShip, a roll-on/roll-off cargo vessel, and shipped to either launch pad. There, they are offloaded and rolled into a HIF. For Delta IV Medium launches, the CBC and DCSS were mated in the HIF. For Delta IV Heavy launches, the port and starboard strap-on CBCs are also mated in the HIF.

Various tests are performed, and then the vehicle is rolled horizontally to the pad, where the Fixed Pad Erector (FPE) is used to raise the vehicle to the vertical position. At this time, the GEM 60 solid motors, if any are required, are rolled to the pad and attached to the vehicle. After further testing, the payload (which has already been enclosed in its fairing) is transported to the pad, hoisted into the MST by a crane, and attached to the vehicle. Finally, on launch day, the MST is rolled away from the vehicle, and the vehicle is ready for launch.

Delta IV launches

Notable launches 

The first payload launched with a Delta IV was the Eutelsat W5 communications satellite. A Medium+ (4,2) from Cape Canaveral carried the communications satellite into geostationary transfer orbit (GTO) on 20 November 2002.

Heavy Demo was the first launch of the Delta IV Heavy in December 2004 after significant delays due to bad weather. Due to cavitation in the propellant lines, sensors on all three CBCs registered depletion of propellant. The strap-on CBCs and then core CBC engines shut down prematurely, even though sufficient propellant remained to continue the burn as scheduled. The second stage attempted to compensate for the shutdown and burned until it ran out of propellant. This flight was a test launch carrying a payload of:
DemoSat  6020 kg; an aluminum cylinder filled with 60 brass rods  planned to be carried to GEO; however due to the sensor faults, the satellite did not reach this orbit.
NanoSat-2, carried to low Earth orbit (LEO)  a set of two very small satellites of 24 and 21 kg, nicknamed Sparky and Ralphie  planned to orbit for one day. Given the under-burn, the two most likely did not reach a stable orbit.

NROL-22 was the first Delta IV launched from SLC-6 at Vandenberg Air Force Base (VAFB). It was launched aboard a Medium+ (4,2) in June 2006 carrying a classified satellite for the U.S. National Reconnaissance Office (NRO).

DSP-23 was the first launch of a valuable payload aboard a Delta IV Heavy. This was also the first Delta IV launch contracted by the United Launch Alliance, a joint venture between Boeing and Lockheed Martin. The main payload was the 23rd and final Defense Support Program missile-warning satellite, DSP-23. Launch from Cape Canaveral occurred on 10 November 2007.

NROL-26 was the first Delta IV Heavy EELV launch for the NRO. USA 202, a classified reconnaissance satellite, lifted off 18 January 2009.

NROL-32 was a Delta IV Heavy launch, carrying a satellite for NRO. The payload is speculated to be the largest satellite sent into space. After a delay from 19 October 2010, the rocket lifted off on 21 November 2010.

NROL-49 lifted off from Vandenberg AFB on 20 January 2011. It was the first Delta IV Heavy mission to be launched out of Vandenberg. This mission was for the NRO and its details are classified.

On 4 October 2012, a Delta IV M+ (4,2) experienced an anomaly in the upper stage's RL10B-2 engine which resulted in lower than expected thrust. While the vehicle had sufficient fuel margins to successfully place the payload, a GPS Block IIF satellite USA-239, into its targeted orbit, investigation into the glitch delayed subsequent Delta IV launches and the next Atlas V launch (AV-034) due to commonality between the engines used on both vehicles' upper stages. By December 2012, ULA had determined the cause of the anomaly to be a fuel leak (into the combustion chamber), and Delta IV launches resumed in May 2013. After two more successful launches, further investigation led to the delay of Delta flight 365 with the GPS IIF-5 satellite. Originally scheduled to launch in October 2013, the vehicle lifted off on 21 February 2014.

A Delta IV Heavy launched the Orion spacecraft on an uncrewed test flight, EFT-1, on 5 December 2014. The launch was originally planned for 4 December 2014, but high winds and valve issues caused the launch to be rescheduled for 5 December 2014.

On August 12, 2018, another Delta IV Heavy launched the Parker Solar Probe on a mission to explore or "touch" the outer corona of the Sun.

The second GPS Block III satellite was launched with the final Delta IV Medium+ (4,2) configuration on 22 August 2019.

The final flight of the Delta IV, in the heavy configuration, will be NROL-70 which will launch in 2024. It will also be the final flight of the Delta rocket family before it is replaced with the Vulcan rocket.

See also 

 Comparison of orbital launchers families
 Comparison of orbital launch systems
 Advanced Cryogenic Evolved Stage
 Expendable launch system
 List of launch vehicles

References

External links 

 Delta IV Launch Vehicle page on United Launch Alliance site
 Boeing's Delta IV Rocket page
 Delta IV information on Gunter's Space page
 Boeing press kit for Heavy Demo launch, 2005
 Comparison of Delta IV Heavy with Space Shuttle
 First Vandenberg Delta IV Heavy launch video via EducatedEarth.
 Bates, Jason. Boeing's Delta IV Heavy Gets Ready for its Close-Up, Space News, 2004-12-06.
 Rocketdyne Space Page
 Delta IV page on Astronautix.com

Delta (rocket family)
Decatur, Alabama
Huntington Beach, California
Boeing spacecraft and space launch systems
Military space program of the United States
United Launch Alliance space launch vehicles
Vehicles introduced in 2002